The Macau national roller hockey team is the national team side of Macau at international roller hockey. Usually is part of FIRS Roller Hockey B World Cup and Roller Hockey Asia Cup.

Macau squad - 2010 FIRS Roller Hockey B World Cup

Team Staff
 General manager:Antonio da Silva Aguiar
 Mechanic:

Coaching Staff
 Head coach: Alberto Lisboa
 Assistant:

Titles
9 Roller Hockey Asia Cup- 1987, 1991, 1997, 2004, 2005, 2007, 2009, 2010, 2012

See also
 Sports in Macau

References

External links
Blog about Macau Roller Hockey

National Roller Hockey Team
Roller hockey
National roller hockey (quad) teams